In topology, Lebesgue's number lemma, named after Henri Lebesgue, is a useful tool in the study of compact metric spaces. It states:

Such a number  is called a Lebesgue number of this cover. The notion of a Lebesgue number itself is useful in other applications as well.

Proof 

Since  is compact we can extract a finite subcover .
If any one of the 's equals  then any  will serve as a Lebesgue number.
Otherwise for each , let , note that  is not empty, and define a function  by

 

Since  is continuous on a compact set, it attains a minimum . 
Now we can verify that this  is the desired Lebesgue number.
Since  there must exist at least one  such that . But this means that  and so, in particular, .

References
 

Theorems in topology
Lemmas